František Makeš (born 1931 in Zlín, Czechoslovakia) is a Swedish artist, scientist and chemist, speciaslising in the conservation of art objects.

Career
He studied at the Academy of Fine Arts in Prague. In the mid-1960s, he participated in the preservation work of the Royal collection in Prague and reached great international fame for his conservation work. After the occupation in 1968 he moved to Sweden and continued his research, where he was awarded a Ph.D. degree by the University of Gothenburg.

He worked, among other things, as chief curator of the Swedish royal palace and its art collections.

In 2005 Makeš was awarded the "Gratias Agit Award" by the Czech Ministry of Culture.

In 2006 Makeš was awarded H. M. The King's Medal 8th size in silver with a blue ribbon for significant and sustained action on the preservation of art and painting, mainly in connection with the art collections at Skokloster.

Internationally, he is recognized for his scientific approach regarding the disclosure of imitation paintings and for his two patents in biochemistry. Today, Makeš continues his research with polarographic analysis and is thus in the footsteps of Jaroslav Heyrovský who received the Nobel Prize in Chemistry in 1957. Makeš's latest research focuses on how we can best save our cultural heritage.

Scientific works 

 Enzymatic consolidation of paintings 
 Remarks on relining 
 Enzymatic consolidation of the portrait of Rudolf II as "Vertumnus by Giuseppe Arcimboldo with a new multi-enzyme preparation isolated from antarctic krill (Euphausia superba) 
 Enzymatic examination of the authenticity of a painting attributed to Rembrandt : krill enzymes as diagnostic tool for identification of "The repentant Magdalene" 
 Investigation, restoration and conservation of Matthaeus Merian portraits 
 Damage to old bookbindings in the Skoloster library : a new method of inhibiting injurious enzymes in leather 
 Enzymatic restoration and authentication of Giuseppe Arcimboldo's "Vertumnus" 
 Mold damage to cultural memorials : a new method of removing molds and material attacked by molds from pictures using krill enzymes 
 Analysis and conservation of the picture "Rudolph II" by G. Arcimboldi 
 Enzymatic consolidation of a painting : seventeenth century landscape from Skokloster Palace 
 Damage to old bookbindings in the Skokholster Library : a new method of inhibiting injurious enzymes in leather. 
 Enzimatic consolidation of a painting: seventeenth century landscape from Skokloster Palace 
 Enzymatic Hydrolysis of the lining paste in eeckhout picture 'Joseph and His Brothers' by krill enzymes 
 Enzymatic consolidation of paintings 
 Enzymatic removal of lining paste from the pictures 
 Enzymatic consolidation of a painting: seventeenth century landscape from skokloster palace 
 Novel enzymatic technologies to safeguard cultural heritage 
 Novel enzymatic technologies to ascertain authenticity of a 14th century Madonna

References

Czech emigrants to Sweden
Conservator-restorers
Swedish chemists
Czech chemists
People from Zlín
1931 births
Living people